Stefano Pescosolido (born 13 June 1971) is a former tennis player from Italy, who turned professional in 1989. Pescosolido was born in Sora.

He represented his native country at the 1996 Summer Olympics in Atlanta, Georgia, where he was defeated in the first round by Brazil's Fernando Meligeni.  The right-hander won two career titles in singles, and reached his career-high ATP singles ranking of World No. 42 in March 1992.

ATP career finals

Singles: 2 (2 titles)

Doubles: 3 (1 title, 2 runner-ups)

ATP Challenger and ITF Futures finals

Singles: 20 (10–10)

Doubles: 19 (10–9)

Junior Grand Slam finals

Doubles: 1 (1 runner-up)

Performance timelines

Singles

Doubles

References

External links
 
 
 

1971 births
Living people
Italian male tennis players
Olympic tennis players of Italy
Sportspeople from the Province of Frosinone
People from Sora, Lazio
Tennis players at the 1996 Summer Olympics
Mediterranean Games gold medalists for Italy
Mediterranean Games medalists in tennis
Competitors at the 1991 Mediterranean Games